In geometry, the snub order-6 square tiling is a uniform tiling of the hyperbolic plane. It has Schläfli symbol of s{(4,4,3)} or s{4,6}.

Images 
Drawn in chiral pairs:

Symmetry
The symmetry is doubled as a snub order-6 square tiling, with only one color of square. It has Schläfli symbol of s{4,6}.

Related polyhedra and tiling 
The vertex figure 3.3.3.4.3.4 does not uniquely generate a uniform hyperbolic tiling. Another with quadrilateral fundamental domain (3 2 2 2) and 2*32 symmetry is generated by :

See also
 Square tiling
 Uniform tilings in hyperbolic plane
 List of regular polytopes

Footnotes

References
 John H. Conway, Heidi Burgiel, Chaim Goodman-Strass, The Symmetries of Things 2008,  (Chapter 19, The Hyperbolic Archimedean Tessellations)

External links 
 
 
 Hyperbolic and Spherical Tiling Gallery
 KaleidoTile 3: Educational software to create spherical, planar and hyperbolic tilings
 Hyperbolic Planar Tessellations, Don Hatch

Hyperbolic tilings
Isogonal tilings
Snub tilings
Uniform tilings